Bath City Women's Football Club is a football club based in Bath, Somerset, England. The club is affiliated to the Somerset FA and currently competes in the Somerset Women's County League Division One, the seventh tier of Women's English football. Though multiple Bath City women's teams have existed in the past, the current team was founded last year, in 2022. The team play their home games at Twerton Park. Like the men’s team, the women’s squad play in black and white shirts, and are nicknamed “The Romans” which stems from Bath's ancient Roman history.

History

Previous Teams 

In June, 1920, the first record of any women's team in Bath was formed as simply; "Bath Ladies Football Club". With The Bath Chronicle at the time stating: "Enthusiastic reception of the proposed club, many ladies have shown their wish to join." Application's for squad entry were received from places as far as Gloucester, Bristol and the Isle of Wight. It was suggested by Chairman Mr Hopkins that the colours ought to be the same as the men's; black and white jerseys, with black shorts, black stockings, white rings, and black woolly caps. A year later In 1921, Bath City Ladies played at Old Trafford in front of 31,000 to raise money for unemployed ex-servicemen in Manchester. The fixture raised £2,000 for the fund to help returning soldiers from the World War 1. On Saturday 28 April 1921, the womens team played Southampton Women's in front of 12,000 at Bristol. However, in the same year, The Football Association banned women's football because the Association felt the physicality of the game was; “unsuitable for women”. Women's football suffered for decades but it was reintroduced around the mid-century and has since progressed significantly.

Current Team Lauch 
The current club were founded in June 2022. Chairman, Nick Blofeld stated, “As a Community owned club with a commitment to inclusion, we’ve wanted to get a women’s side up and running for a number of seasons. Thanks to Novia, we now have the resources in place to launch our women’s team in a sustainable and hopefully successful way. We are ambitious for our women’s team and want to provide the best support for them both on and off the pitch. Playing home games at Twerton Park is a clear demonstration of our one club, two teams approach whereby our women’s team is treated equally with our men’s.”

Jane Jones, who is the Women's Team Lead said, “Bath City have a long and proud history of women’s football and now with it on the rise, including the Women's Euro‘s in England this summer, it’s a perfect time to revive that tradition and launch our new women’s team. The club is fully behind us and, in addition to all the performance support the team will get, we will make sure that they are fully promoted too, with dedicated social media channels and on our website. We hope that playing for Bath City Women will be appealing to local players and we hope that our club can help grow the women’s game in our local area.”

On 29 August 2022, for the final game of pre-season preparation, The Bath City women’s team won 9–0 against Wells City ladies. However the club started the league campaign poorly. On Sunday 2nd September 2022, the team competed in their first ever competitive league match, in which they lost 4–0 to Penhill ladies away. Albiet a poor start did not hinder the team, a run of winning steaks, and good performances has placed the team second in the Somerset County women’s league, as of the 9 March, 2023.

Stadium 

Twerton Park is a football stadium in the Twerton suburb of Bath, England. The women’s team have stated playing there since their inception. The stadium has a physical capacity of 8,840 1,006 of which are seats. It has been the home of Bath City F.C. since 1932. From 1986 to 1996 Bristol Rovers played at the ground following their departure from Eastville. From 2020 the ground also became the home stadium for Bristol City Women.

The stadium has four stands; the Bath End, the Grandstand, The Popular Side, and the Bristol End. Though the site opened in 1909, the stadium was not constructed until 1932, with The Grandstand being the first of the four stands to be constructed. The stadium is 2.5 km (1.6 miles) from the city centre. 

The two bars within the stadium are named after former players: Charlies' (Charlie Fleming), and Randall's (Paul Randall). Twerton Park has underwent several expansions throughout its history, though the decades in which it saw the most development were the 1930s, 1960s and 1980s - including the addition of the family stand, West of The Grandstand. Future expansion is likely to involve the complete redevelopment of The Grandstand and the surrounding car park.

Players

Club officials

Coaching and medical staff

Board of directors

See also

 Bath City F.C.
 List of women's association football clubs in England and Wales
 Women's football in England
 List of women's association football clubs

References

External links
 

 
 
1889 establishments in England
Association football clubs established in 1889
Football clubs in England
Southern Football League clubs
Bath, Somerset